Badanpur is a panchayat village in Mathura district of Uttar Pradesh, India. It is located in the Naujhil block of the Mant Tehsil.

Politics
Mant (Assembly constituency) is the Vidhan Sabha constituency. Mathura (Lok Sabha constituency) is the parliamentary constituency.

References

  

Villages in Mathura district